The Kuwait national futsal team represents Kuwait in international futsal competitions and is controlled by the Kuwait Football Association.

Coaches

 Hossein Shams (2003-2006)
 Ricardo Sobral (2018-2022)

Tournaments

FIFA Futsal World Cup

AFC Futsal Asian Cup

* =  At the first qualified because of top 4 in 2014 competition, but later could not participate due to FIFA's suspension of the Kuwait Football Association.

**= Could not participate in West Zone qualifier due to FIFA's suspension of the Kuwait Football Association was still in effect.

Asian Indoor and Martial Arts Games

West Asian Championship

Confederations Cup

*Denotes draws includes knockout matches decided on penalty shootouts. Red border indicates that the tournament was hosted on home soil. Gold, silver, bronze backgrounds indicates 1st, 2nd and 3rd finishes respectively.

Honours
 Arabian Gulf Futsal Cup: 2
 2013, 2015

 WAFF Futsal Championship: 1
 2022
 GCC Games: 1
 Gold: 2022

Minor/Friendly
 Croatia Winter International:1
 2018

References

Asian national futsal teams
Futsal
National futsal
National